Bayside is plantation comprising a historic plantation house built in 1850 by Francis DuBose Richardson on the Bayou Teche in Jeanerette, Louisiana, United States. Richardson, a classmate and friend of Edgar Allan Poe, purchased the land for a sugar plantation.

Richardson attended St. Mary's College in Baltimore, Maryland. He was elected to the Louisiana Senate and sponsored legislation establishing the Louisiana School for the Blind, which institution is extant in Baton Rouge. His daughter, Bethia Richardson, married Donelson Caffery II, a Louisiana State Senator and a United States Senator. Richardson's great grandson, Patrick Thomson Caffery served as a Louisiana State Representative and a United States Representative. It is believed that Edgar Allan Poe slept at Bayside while visiting Richardson.

Despite some alterations and an unclear architectural development, the two-story brick Greek Revival plantation house remains one of Iberia Parish's finest Greek Revival structures.

The house and surrounding  area was listed on the National Register of Historic Places on January 29, 1987.

See also
National Register of Historic Places listings in Iberia Parish, Louisiana

References

Jeanerette, Louisiana
Houses in Iberia Parish, Louisiana
Houses on the National Register of Historic Places in Louisiana
Plantation houses in Louisiana
National Register of Historic Places in Iberia Parish, Louisiana